3669 Vertinskij, provisional designation , is a stony Florian asteroid from the inner regions of the asteroid belt, approximately  in diameter. It was discovered on 21 October 1982, by Soviet astronomer Lyudmila Karachkina at the Crimean Astrophysical Observatory in Nauchnij, on the Crimean peninsula. The S-type asteroid was named for Russian artist Alexander Vertinsky.

Orbit and classification 

Vertinskij is a member of the Flora family, a giant asteroid family and the largest family of stony asteroids in the main-belt. It orbits the Sun in the inner asteroid belt at a distance of 2.1–2.4 AU once every 3 years and 3 months (1,203 days; semi-major axis of 2.21 AU). Its orbit has an eccentricity of 0.07 and an inclination of 5° with respect to the ecliptic.

The body's observation arc begins with a precovery taken at the Palomar Observatory in November 1949, nearly 33 years prior to its official discovery observation at Nauchnij.

Physical characteristics 

In the SMASS classification, Vertinskij is a common stony S-type asteroid.

Rotation period 

In December 2015, photometric observations of Vertinskij at the Oakley Southern Sky Observatory gave no conclusive results due to excessive noise and/or insufficient data. As of 2018, the body's rotation period, pole and shape remain unknown.

Diameter and albedo 

According to the survey carried out by the NEOWISE mission of NASA's Wide-field Infrared Survey Explorer, Vertinskij measures between 6.243 and 6.467 kilometers in diameter and its surface has an albedo between 0.2229 and 0.238, while the Collaborative Asteroid Lightcurve Link assumes an albedo of 0.24 – derived from 8 Flora, the parent body of the Flora family – and calculates a diameter of 6.51 kilometers based on an absolute magnitude of 13.1.

Naming 

This minor planet was named after Russian artist and poet Alexander Vertinsky (1889–1957). The official naming citation was published by the Minor Planet Center on 12 September 1992.

References

External links 
 Asteroid Lightcurve Database (LCDB), query form (info )
 Dictionary of Minor Planet Names, Google books
 Discovery Circumstances: Numbered Minor Planets (1)-(5000) – Minor Planet Center
 
 

003669
Discoveries by Lyudmila Karachkina
Named minor planets
003669
19821021